Hemiaspis is a genus of venomous snakes of the Elapidae family. The genus has two described species: Hemiaspis damelii and Hemiaspis signata, both endemic to Australia.

References

 
Snake genera
Taxa named by Leopold Fitzinger
Snakes of Australia